The 2010–11 Principality Premiership is the sixteenth Principality Premiership season and the seventh under its current format. The season began in August 2010 and will end in May 2011. Fourteen teams are playing each other on a home and away basis, with the standard bonus point system determining placement—4 points for a win, 2 for a draw, and separate bonus points for scoring four or more tries in a match and losing by seven points or less.

British and Irish Cup Qualification

In 2009-10 the top six clubs from the 2008-09 season qualified for the new British and Irish Cup competition. A play-off system was added at the end of the season for the top eight sides to qualify for the following season's British and Irish Cup. Only six teams can qualify for this from the eight. These play-offs do not decide the League Championship, as the league leaders at the end of the regular 26 game season will be Champions.

Play-off News

At the start of the 2010-11 season it was announced that the Welsh Premiership title would be settled by a play-off at a neutral ground. At the end of the season, play-offs will involve the second and third placed teams meeting at a neutral venue, with the winners facing the team who finished top after the regular season in the final. Two-other play-off issues are also set to feature at the end of the campaign. The top five teams in the league will win automatic entry into the following season's British and Irish Cup with the sixth and final place decided by a play-off. This will see the teams finishing in 7th and 8th position meeting for the right to play the sixth-placed club.

Promotion from Division 1 is also being revamped from the 2010-11 season with play-offs taking place for this too. The bottom-placed team in the Welsh Premiership will be grouped with the respective division winners in Division 1 East, North and West - provided they meet the Premiership criteria. A draw involving the 14th placed club in the Principality Premiership, winners of SWALEC Division One East and West (those clubs have all passed the Premiership criteria) will be made to determine which clubs play each other in play-off one, the winner of which will play the third team in the play-off final).

The fourteen teams competing consisted of Aberavon RFC, Bedwas RFC, Cardiff RFC, Carmarthen Quins, Cross Keys RFC, Glamorgan Wanderers RFC, Llandovery RFC, Llanelli RFC, Neath RFC, Newport RFC, Pontypool RFC, Pontypridd RFC, Swansea RFC, Tonmawr RFC

Teams

Stadiums

Table

Fixtures & results

Week 1

Week 2

Week 3

Week 4

Week 5

Week 6

Week 7

Week 8

Week 9

Week 10

Week 11

Week 12

Week 13

Week 14

Week 15
All games postponed due to the weather.

Week 16

Week 17

Week 18
All games postponed due to the weather.

Week 19

Week 20

Week 21

Week 22

Week 23
All games postponed due to frozen pitches.

Week 24

All games postponed due to some Swalec cup matches being replayed.

Week 25

Week 26

Week 27

Week 28

Week 29

Week 30

Week 31

Week 32

Relegation/Promotion play-offs

Play-off One

Glamorgan play Bridgend in the final to see who will be playing Premiership Rugby next season and who will be in Division 1.

Relegation/Promotion play-off Final

Bridgend are promoted to the Premiership while Glamorgan are relegated

British and Irish Cup play-offs

Sixth place British and Irish Cup Qualification play-offs

Newport travel to Cross Keys with the winners taking the final place in next season's British and Irish Cup competition

Sixth place British and Irish Cup Qualification play-off Final

Cross Keys qualify for the final place in next season's British and Irish Cup

Principality Premiership Champions play-offs

Principality Premiership Semi-Final play-offs
Llanelli play Pontypridd who ended the regular season as league leaders to see who are the Champions

Principality Premiership play-off Final

Llanelli are the Principality Premiership Champions

Welsh Premier Division seasons
2010–11 in Welsh rugby union
Wales